Yossi Harel (January 4, 1918 – April 26, 2008) was the commander of the  operation and a leading member of the Israeli intelligence community.

Biography
Yossi Hamburger (later Harel) and his twin brother Natan were born in Jerusalem to Moshe and Batya Hamburger. He was a sixth generation Jerusalemite. He attended Tachkemoni School and as a teenager, worked in a quarry and laid telegraph cables for the post office.  At the age of 15, he joined the Haganah.

Harel's first marriage was to Esther Vaisch and they had one daughter, Nurit. In 1951 he married Julie Berez with whom he had two children, Sharon and David. His daughter, Sharon Harel, is the third wife of Sir Ronald Cohen.

Harel died of a heart attack in Tel Aviv on April 26, 2008, at the age of 90. He is buried at Kibbutz Sdot Yam, near Cesarea.

Military and intelligence career
He fought under Orde Wingate. Between 1945 and 1948, he played a leading role in the clandestine immigration enterprise in Palestine, commanding four Aliyah Bet ships: Knesset Israel, the Exodus 1947, Atzma'ut and Kibbutz Galuyot. After the establishment of the State of Israel, Harel studied mechanical engineering at MIT in the United States. Just before he finished his studies, Moshe Dayan, as Chief of Staff, called him back to Israel to investigate the Lavon Affair and made him head of Unit 131, an Israel Defense Forces intelligence unit.

Legacy and commemoration
Harel is the subject of a biography in Hebrew by Yoram Kaniuk, Exodus: The Odyssey of a Commander (1999), which has been translated into many languages. He rose to fame after the release of the 1960 Otto Preminger film Exodus, which was based on the 1958 Leon Uris novel of the same name.  His character in the novel, Ari Ben Canaan, was portrayed by Paul Newman.

In 2007 the government of Italy awarded the Exodus prize to Harel.  The prize is given annually to individuals who promote peace and humanitarianism at La Spezia in Italy, where the ship Exodus 1947 was renovated.

References

External links
 Yossi Harel Hungarian Tribute
 Obituary: Times

1918 births
2008 deaths
Aliyah Bet activists
People from Jerusalem
People of the Mossad
Israeli twins
Steamship captains
Palmach members